Edwin Raymond Bailey  (born May 15, 1959 in Savannah, Georgia) is a former guard in the National Football League.  Bailey attended South Carolina State University and eventually earned his degree at Charter Oak State College. He was the New York/New Jersey Hitmen of the XFL's Offensive Line Coach.

Bailey is Director of Operations for Camp III, at AMIKIDS, Savannah River, Georgia.

References

1959 births
Living people
American football offensive linemen
Seattle Seahawks players
South Carolina State Bulldogs football players
Charter Oak State College alumni
Players of American football from Savannah, Georgia
New York/New Jersey Hitmen coaches